Manchester United Women Football Club is an English professional football club based in Leigh, Greater Manchester. The club was formed as a professional outfit in May 2018 and is the direct female affiliate of Manchester United F.C. This list encompasses the major honours won by Manchester United and records set by the club, their managers and their players.

All stats accurate as of match played 19 March 2023.

Honours

Domestic

League 
Women's Championship (Level 2): 1

 2018–19

Player records

Appearances 

 Youngest first-team player: Lauren James –  (against Liverpool, League Cup, 19 August 2018)
 Oldest first-team player: Siobhan Chamberlain –  (against Crystal Palace, Women's Championship, 20 April 2019)
 Oldest outfield first-team player: Rachel Williams –  (against Lewes, FA Cup, 19 March 2023)
 Most consecutive League appearances: 73 – Mary Earps, 7 September 2019 – present
 Most consecutive League appearances (outfield player): 61 – Ella Toone, 12 February 2020 – present

Most appearances 
Competitive, professional matches only. Appearances as substitute (in parentheses) included in total.

Goalscorers 

 Most goals in a season in all competitions: 18 – Jessica Sigsworth, 2018–19
 Most League goals in a season: 17 – Jessica Sigsworth, Women's Championship, 2018–19
 Most goals scored in a match: 5
Jessica Sigsworth v Aston Villa, Women's Championship, 9 September 2018
Ella Toone v Leicester City, League Cup 21 November 2019
 Goals in consecutive league matches: 7 consecutive matches
Ella Toone, 25 November 2018 to 24 March 2019
Jessica Sigsworth, 10 March 2019 to 7 September 2019
 Youngest first-team goalscorer: Lauren James –  (against Aston Villa, Women's Championship, 9 September 2018)
 Oldest first-team goalscorer: Rachel Williams –  (against Reading, Women's Super League, 22 January 2023)
 Fastest goal: 14 seconds – Megan Walsh (o.g.) v Brighton & Hove Albion, Women's Super League, 12 February 2020
 Fastest hat-trick: 10 minutes 9 seconds – Jessica Sigsworth v Aston Villa, 9 September 2018
 Most hat-tricks: 2 – Ella Toone (13 February 2019 to 21 November 2019)

Overall scorers 
 Competitive, professional matches only, appearances including substitutes appear in brackets.

Goalkeepers 
 Most clean sheets in a season in all competitions: 19 – Siobhan Chamberlain, 2018–19
 Most League clean sheets in a season: 13 – Siobhan Chamberlain, Women's Championship, 2018–19
 Clean sheets in consecutive league matches: 5 consecutive matches
Siobhan Chamberlain, 9 September 2018 to 4 November 2018
Mary Earps, 17 September 2022  to 6 November 2022
 Youngest first-team goalkeeper: Fran Bentley –  (against Millwall Lionesses, Women's Championship, 25 November 2018)
 Oldest first-team goalkeeper: Siobhan Chamberlain –  (against Crystal Palace, Women's Championship, 20 April 2019)

Overall clean sheets 
 Competitive, professional matches only, appearances including substitutes appear in brackets.

Award winners

The Best FIFA Goalkeeper

The following players have won The Best FIFA Goalkeeper award while playing for Manchester United:
 Mary Earps – 2022

PFA Team of the Year

The following players have been named to the PFA Team of the Year while playing for Manchester United:
 Ona Batlle – 2021–22

Internationals

Caps

 First international: Lizzie Arnot for  against  (30 August 2018)
 United's first  international was Alex Greenwood who played against  one day after Arnot played for Scotland as a Manchester United player (31 August 2018)
 United's first non-British international was Jackie Groenen who became a Manchester United player on 1 July 2019 while representing  at the 2019 FIFA Women's World Cup although she did not make her United debut until the season opener on 7 September 2019
 United's first  international was Ella Toone who played against  during the 2020 Summer Olympics on 21 July 2021
 Most international caps (total): 181 – Tobin Heath –  (1 while with the club)
 Most international caps as a United player: 40 – Jackie Groenen –  (97 total caps)

Honours
UEFA European Championship

The following players have won the UEFA Women's Championship while playing for Manchester United:
 Mary Earps – 2022
 Alessia Russo – 2022
 Ella Toone – 2022

Managerial records
 First full-time manager: Casey Stoney – Stoney was named manager in June 2018. It was the former England international's first managerial role. She had previously worked as a member of Phil Neville's England backroom staff.
 Longest-serving manager: Casey Stoney –  (77 matches) (8 June 2018 to 16 May 2021)

Team records

Matches
 First competitive match: Liverpool 0–1 Manchester United, League Cup, 19 August 2018
 First League Cup match: Liverpool 0–1 Manchester United, League Cup, 19 August 2018
 First Home match (at Leigh Sports Village): Manchester United 0–2 Reading, League Cup, 25 August 2018
 First League match: Aston Villa 0–12 Manchester United, Women's Championship, 9 September 2018
 First FA Cup match: Brighton & Hove Albion 0–2 Manchester United, Fourth Round, 3 February 2019
 First match at Old Trafford: Manchester United 2–0 West Ham United, Women's Super League, 27 March 2021

Record wins
Record win: 12–0 vs Aston Villa, Women's Championship, 9 September 2018
Record League win: 12–0 vs Aston Villa, Women's Championship, 9 September 2018
Record FA Cup win: 6–0 vs Burnley, FA Cup Fourth Round, 18 April 2021
Record League Cup win: 11–1 vs Leicester City, League Cup Group Stage, 21 November 2019
Record home win: 11–1 vs Leicester City, League Cup Group Stage, 21 November 2019
Record away win: 12–0 vs Aston Villa, Women's Championship, 9 September 2018

Record defeats
Record defeat: 1–6 vs Chelsea, Women's Super League, 26 September 2021
Record League defeat: 1–6 vs Chelsea, Women's Super League, 26 September 2021
Record FA Cup defeat: 1–4 vs Manchester City, FA Cup fifth round, 27 February 2022
Record League Cup defeat:
0–2 vs Reading, League Cup Group Stage, 25 August 2018
1–3 vs Liverpool, League Cup Group Stage, 7 October 2020
1–3 vs Chelsea, League Cup Semi-final, 2 February 2022
Record home defeat: 1–6 vs Chelsea, Women's Super League, 26 September 2021
Record away defeat: 0–3 vs Manchester City, Women's Super League, 12 February 2021

Streaks
 Longest unbeaten run (competitive matches): 10 matches
9 September 2018 to 9 December 2018
19 November 2022 to 12 March 2023
 Longest unbeaten run (League): 14 matches, 19 January 2020 to 17 January 2021
 Longest winning streak (competitive matches): 7 matches, 12 December 2021 to 2 February 2022
 Longest winning streak (League): 10 matches, 6 January 2019 to 7 September 2019
 Longest losing streak (competitive matches): 2 matches
7 September 2019 to 28 September 2019
25 January 2020 to 2 February 2020
7 February 2021 to 7 March 2021
13 February 2022 to 5 March 2022
 Longest losing streak (League): 2 matches
7 September 2019 to 28 September 2019
7 February 2021 to 7 March 2021
 Longest drawing streak (competitive matches): 4 matches, 9 October 2021 to 17 November 2021
 Longest drawing streak (League): 3 matches, 9 October 2021 to 21 November 2021
 Longest streak without a win (competitive matches): 4 matches
25 January 2020 to 23 February 2020
9 October 2021 to 17 November 2021
2 February 2022 to 5 March 2022
 Longest streak without a win (League): 4 matches, 9 October 2021 to 12 December 2021
 Longest scoring run (competitive matches): 23 matches, 14 October 2018 to 7 September 2019
 Longest scoring run (League): 17 matches, 19 January 2020 to 7 February 2021
 Longest non-scoring run (competitive matches): 2 matches
7 September 2019 to 28 September 2019
7 February 2021 to 7 March 2021
 Longest non-scoring run (League): 2 matches
7 September 2019 to 28 September 2019
7 February 2021 to 7 March 2021
 Longest streak without conceding a goal (competitive matches):7 matches, 12 December 2021 to 2 February 2022
 Longest streak without conceding a goal (League): 5 matches
9 September 2018 to 4 November 2018
17 September 2022 to 6 November 2022
 Longest streak without a clean sheet (competitive matches): 7 matches
25 January 2020 to 4 October 2020
9 October 2021 to 12 December 2021
 Longest streak without a clean sheet (League): 5 matches, 2 February 2020 to 4 October 2020

Wins/draws/losses in a season
 Most wins in a league season: 18 – 2018–19
 Most draws in a league season: 6 – 2021–22
 Most defeats in a league season: 5
2019–20
2020–21
 Fewest wins in a league season: 7 – 2019–20
 Fewest draws in a league season: 1 – 2018–19
 Fewest defeats in a league season: 1 – 2018–19

Goals
 Most League goals scored in a season: 98 – 2018–19
 Fewest League goals scored in a season: 24 – 2019–20
 Most League goals conceded in a season: 22 – 2021–22
 Fewest League goals conceded in a season: 7 – 2018–19

Points
 Most points in a season:  55 – 2018–19
 Fewest points in a season:  23 – 2019–20

Record attendance
Highest home attendance: 30,196 vs Aston Villa, Women's Super League, 3 December 2022
Highest away attendance: 44,259 vs Manchester City, Women's Super League, 11 December 2022
Lowest home attendance: 686 vs Durham, League Cup Group Stage, 5 December 2018

Season-by-season performance

Record by opponent

All-time league record

Overall league record

All-time cup record

Overall cup record

Notes

References

External links
  
MU Women's News  - Manchester United Official Website

 
Manchester United Women